A unit of time is any particular time interval, used as a standard way of measuring or expressing duration. The base unit of time in the International System of Units (SI), and by extension most of the Western world, is the second, defined as about 9 billion oscillations of the caesium atom. The exact modern SI definition is "[The second] is defined by taking the fixed numerical value of the cesium frequency, the unperturbed ground-state hyperfine transition frequency of the cesium 133 atom, to be 9 192 631 770 when expressed in the unit Hz, which is equal to s−1."

Historically, many units of time were defined by the movements of astronomical objects.
 Sun-based: the year was the time for the Earth to revolve around the Sun. Historical year-based units include the Olympiad (four years), the lustrum (five years), the indiction (15 years), the decade, the century, and the millennium.
 Moon-based: the month was based on the Moon's orbital period around the Earth.
 Earth-based: the time it took for the Earth to rotate on its own axis, as observed on a sundial. Units originally derived from this base include the week (seven days), and the fortnight (14 days). Subdivisions of the day include the hour (1/24 of a day), which was further subdivided into minutes and finally seconds. The second became the international standard unit (SI units) for science. 
 Celestial sphere-based: as in sidereal time, where the apparent movement of the stars and constellations across the sky is used to calculate the length of a year.

These units do not have a consistent relationship with each other and require intercalation. For example, the year cannot be divided into twelve 28-day months since 12 times 28 is 336, well short of 365. The lunar month (as defined by the moon's rotation) is not 28 days but 28.3 days. The year, defined in the Gregorian calendar as  days has to be adjusted with leap days and leap seconds. Consequently, these units are now all defined for scientific purposes as multiples of seconds.

Units of time based on orders of magnitude of the second include the nanosecond and the millisecond.

Historical

The natural units for timekeeping used by most historical societies are the day, the solar year and the lunation. Such calendars include the Sumerian, Egyptian, Chinese, Babylonian, ancient Athenian, Buddhist, Hindu, Islamic, Icelandic, Mayan, and French Republican calendars.

The modern calendar has its origins in the Roman calendar, which evolved into the Julian calendar, and then the Gregorian.

Scientific
 The Jiffy is the amount of time light takes to travel one fermi (about the size of a nucleon) in a vacuum.
 The Planck time is the time light takes to travel one Planck length.
 The TU (for Time Unit) is a unit of time defined as 1024 µs for use in engineering.
 The Svedberg is a time unit used for sedimentation rates (usually of proteins). It is defined as 10−13 seconds (100 fs).
 The galactic year, based on the rotation of the galaxy and usually measured in million years.
 The geological time scale relates stratigraphy to time. The deep time of Earth's past is divided into units according to events that took place in each period. For example, the boundary between the Cretaceous period and the Paleogene period is defined by the Cretaceous–Paleogene extinction event. The largest unit is the supereon, composed of eons. Eons are divided into eras, which are in turn divided into periods, epochs and ages. It is not a true mathematical unit, as all ages, epochs, periods, eras, or eons don't have the same length; instead, their length is determined by the geological and historical events that define them individually.

Note: The light-year is not a unit of time, but a unit of length of about 9.5 petametres (9 454 254 955 488 kilometers).

List
{| class="wikitable mw-collapsible"
|+ 
!Name
!Length
!Notes
|-
| Planck time ||  || The amount of time light takes to travel one Planck length.
|-
| yoctosecond ||  || One septillionth of a second.
|-
| jiffy (physics) ||  || The amount of time light takes to travel one fermi (about the size of a nucleon) in a vacuum.
|-
| zeptosecond ||  || One sextillionth of a second. Time measurement scale of the NIST strontium atomic clock. Smallest fragment of time currently measurable is 247 zeptoseconds.
|-
| attosecond ||  || One quintillionth of a second.
|-
| femtosecond ||  || One quadrillionth of a second. Pulse time on fastest lasers.
|-
| Svedberg ||  || Time unit used for sedimentation rates (usually of proteins).
|-
| picosecond ||  || One trillionth of a second.
|-
| nanosecond ||  || One billionth of a second. Time for molecules to fluoresce.
|-
| shake ||  || 10 nanoseconds, also a casual term for a short period of time.
|-
| microsecond || || One millionth of a second. Symbol is µs
|-
| millisecond ||  || One thousandth of a second. Shortest time unit used on stopwatches.
|-
| jiffy (electronics) ||~10-3 s 
| Used to measure the time between alternating power cycles. Also a casual term for a short period of time.
|- style="background-color:rgba(255,255,0,0.25);"
| second || 1 s || SI base unit for time.
|-
| minute ||  ||
|-
| milliday ||  || Also marketed as a ".beat" by the Swatch corporation.
|-
| moment ||  ( on average) || Medieval unit of time used by astronomers to compute astronomical movements, length varies with the season. Also colloquially refers to a brief period of time.
|-
| kilosecond ||  || About 17 minutes.
|-
| hour ||  ||
|-
| day ||  || Longest unit used on stopwatches and countdowns.
|-
| week ||  || Historically sometimes also called "sennight".
|-
| megasecond ||  || About 11.6 days.
|-
| fortnight ||  || 14 days
|-
| lunar month ||  || Various definitions of lunar month exist.
|-
| month ||  || Occasionally calculated as 30 days.
|-
|quarantine
|40 d (approximately 5.71 weeks)
|To retain in obligatory isolation or separation, as a sanitary measure to prevent the spread of contagious disease. Historically it meant to be isolated for 40 days. From Middle English quarentine, from Italian quarantina (“forty days”), the period Venetians customarily kept ships from plague-ridden countries waiting off port, from quaranta (“forty”), from Latin quadrāgintā.
|-
| semester ||  || A division of the academic year. Literally "six months", also used in this sense.
|-
| lunar year ||  ||
|-
| year ||  || 
|-
| common year ||  || 52 weeks and 1 day.
|-
| tropical year ||  ||Average.
|-
| Gregorian year ||  ||Average.
|-
| sidereal year || 
|-
| leap year ||  ||  and 
|-
| olympiad ||  || A quadrennium (plural: quadrennia or quadrenniums) is also a period of four years, most commonly used in reference to the four-year period between each Olympic Games. It is also used in reference to the four-year interval between leap years, for example when wishing friends and family a "happy quadrennium" on February 29.
|-
| lustrum ||   || In early Roman times, the interval between censuses.
|-
| decade ||   ||
|-
| indiction ||   || Interval for taxation assessments (Roman Empire).  
|-
|score
|20 yr
|
|-
| gigasecond ||  || About 31.7 years.
|-
| jubilee || 
|-
| century ||   ||
|-
| millennium ||  || Also called "kiloannum".
|-
| terasecond ||  || About 31,709 years.
|-
| megaannum ||  || Also called "Megayear." 1,000 millennia (plural of millennium), or 1 million years (in geology, abbreviated as Ma).
|-
| petasecond ||  || About 31,709,791 years.
|-
| galactic year || ||The amount of time it takes the Solar System to orbit the center of the Milky Way Galaxy. Around 230,000,000 years.
|-
| cosmological decade || varies ||10 times the length of the previous cosmological decade, with CÐ 1 beginning either 10 seconds or 10 years after the Big Bang, depending on the definition.
|-
| aeon ||  || Also refers to an indefinite period of time, otherwise is 1,000,000,000 years.
|-
| kalpa ||  || Used in Hindu mythology. About 4,320,000,000 years.
|-
| Universal year||  || How old the universe is. Around 93,000,000,000 years.
|-
| exasecond ||  || About 31,709,791,983 years. Approximately 2.3 times the current age of the universe.
|-
| zettasecond ||  || About 31,709,791,983,764 years.
|-
| yottasecond ||  || About 31,709,791,983,764,584 years.
|-
|}

Interrelation

All of the formal units of time are scaled multiples of each other. The most common units are the second, defined in terms of an atomic process; the day, an integral multiple of seconds; and the year, usually 365 days. The other units used are multiples or divisions of these three.

See also
Unit of frequency

References